This is a list of award winners and league leaders for the Philadelphia Phillies professional baseball team.

Award winners

Most Valuable Player (NL)

Note: This award was known as the Kenesaw Mountain Landis Memorial Baseball Award 1944-2019.
See footnotes.
Chuck Klein (1932)
Jim Konstanty (1950)
Mike Schmidt (1980, 1981, 1986)
Ryan Howard (2006)
Jimmy Rollins (2007)
Bryce Harper (2021)

Cy Young Award (NL)

See footnotes
Steve Carlton (1972, 1977, 1980, 1982)
John Denny (1983)
Steve Bedrosian (1987)
Roy Halladay (2010)

Rookie of the Year Award (NL)

Note: This was renamed the Jackie Robinson Award in 1987.
See footnote.
Jack Sanford (1957)
Dick Allen (1964)
Scott Rolen (1997)
Ryan Howard (2005)

Manager of the Year Award (NL)

See footnotes.
Larry Bowa (2001)

Rawlings Gold Glove Award (NL)

See footnote.

Pitcher

Bobby Shantz (1964)
Jim Kaat (1976, 1977)
Steve Carlton (1981)

Catcher

Bob Boone (1978, 1979)
Mike Lieberthal (1999)
J. T. Realmuto (2019, 2022)

First base

Bill White (1966)

Second base

Manny Trillo (1979, 1981, 1982)

Third base

Mike Schmidt (1976, 1977, 1978, 1979, 1980, 1981, 1982, 1983, 1984, 1986)
Scott Rolen (1998, 2000, 2001)
Placido Polanco (2011)

Shortstop

Bobby Wine (1963)
Ruben Amaro Sr. (1964)
Larry Bowa (1972, 1978)
Jimmy Rollins (2007, 2008, 2009, 2012)

Outfield

See footnote
Garry Maddox (1975, 1976, 1977, 1978, 1979, 1980, 1981, 1982)
Bobby Abreu (2005)
Aaron Rowand (2007)
Shane Victorino (2008, 2009, 2010)

All-MLB Team

First team
Catcher
JT Realmuto (2019, 2022)

Outfield
Bryce Harper (2021)

Second team
Pitcher
Aaron Nola (2022)
Zack Wheeler (2021)

Catcher
JT Realmuto (2021)

Outfield
Kyle Schwarber (2022)

Wilson Defensive Player of the Year Award

Note: In its first two years, the award was given to a player on each MLB team; one awardee was then named the Overall Defensive Player of the Year for the American League and another for the National League. Starting in 2014, the award is now given to one player at each position for all of Major League Baseball; one of the nine awardees is then named the Overall Defensive Player of the Year for all of Major League Baseball.
Team (all positions)
Carlos Ruiz (2012, 2013)

Silver Slugger Award (NL)

See footnotes

Catcher

Darren Daulton (1992)
J. T. Realmuto (2019)

First base

Pete Rose (1981)
Ryan Howard (2006)

Second base

Manny Trillo (1980, 1981)
Juan Samuel (1987)
Chase Utley (2006, 2007, 2008, 2009)

Third base

Mike Schmidt (1980, 1981, 1982, 1983, 1984, 1986)
Scott Rolen (2002)

 Shortstop

Jimmy Rollins (2007)

 Outfield

See footnote
Lenny Dykstra (1993)
Bobby Abreu (2004)
Bryce Harper (2021)

Hank Aaron Award (NL)

See footnote.
Ryan Howard (2006)
Bryce Harper (2021)

Rolaids Relief Man Award (NL)

See footnote
Al Holland (1983)
Steve Bedrosian (1987)
Brad Lidge (2008)

MLB Delivery Man of the Year Award

Note: Awarded to one player in Major League Baseball (not one for each league).
See footnote
Brad Lidge (2008)

MLB Comeback Player of the Year Award (NL)

Brad Lidge (2008)

MLB Clutch Performer of the Year Award
Note: Awarded to one player in Major League Baseball (not one for each league).
See footnote and 
Roy Halladay (2010)

Roberto Clemente Award

Note: Awarded to one player in Major League Baseball (not one for each league).
Greg Luzinski (1978)
Garry Maddox (1986)
Jimmy Rollins (2014)

MLB "This Year in Baseball Awards"

Note: These awards were re-named the "GIBBY Awards" (Greatness in Baseball Yearly) in 2010 and then the "Esurance MLB Awards" in 2015.
Note: Voted by five groups as the best in all of Major League Baseball (i.e., not two awards, one for each league).

"This Year in Baseball Awards" Starting Pitcher of the Year
Roy Halladay (2010)

"This Year in Baseball Awards" Closer of the Year
See footnote
Brad Lidge (2008)

"This Year in Baseball Awards" Rookie of the Year
J. A. Happ (2009)

"This Year in Baseball Awards" X-Factor Player of the Year
Note: In 2009, this was named "Unsung Player of the Year".
Jayson Werth (2009)
Carlos Ruiz (2010)

"This Year in Baseball Awards" Executive of the Year
Pat Gillick (2008)
Rubén Amaro, Jr. (2009)

"This Year in Baseball Awards" Manager of the Year
See footnote
Charlie Manuel (2008)

"This Year in Baseball Awards" Postseason Moment of the Year
Chase Utley (2008)
Roy Halladay (2010)

Major League Triple Crown: Pitching

Grover Cleveland Alexander (1915)

Triple Crown (NL): Batting

Chuck Klein (1933)

Triple Crown (NL): Pitching

Grover Cleveland Alexander (1915, 1916)
Steve Carlton (1972)

NL All-Stars

For list of Phillies' All-Stars (1933–present), see footnote

World Series MVP Award

Mike Schmidt (1980)
Cole Hamels (2008)

NLCS MVP Award

Manny Trillo (1980)
Gary Matthews (1983)
Curt Schilling (1993)
Cole Hamels (2008)
Ryan Howard (2009)
Bryce Harper (2022)

All-Star Game MVP Award

Note: This was renamed the Ted Williams Most Valuable Player Award in 2002.
Johnny Callison (1964)

All-Star Game—Home Run Derby champion

Bobby Abreu (2005)
Ryan Howard (2006)

Major League Baseball All-Century Team (1999)

Pete Rose (one of 10 outfielders)
Mike Schmidt (one of two third basemen)

DHL Hometown Heroes (2006)

Mike Schmidt — voted by MLB fans as the most outstanding player in the history of the franchise, based on on-field performance, leadership quality and character value

Frank Slocum Big B.A.T. Award

Brad Lidge (2010)

Fishel Award (for public-relations excellence)
Larry Shenk (1983)

Major League Baseball All-Time Team (1997; Baseball Writers' Association of America)

Mike Schmidt (first team; third baseman)

Baseball's 100 Greatest Players (1998; The Sporting News)
See footnote
No. 25 – Pete Rose
No. 28 – Mike Schmidt
No. 30 – Steve Carlton

Sports Illustrated MLB All-Decade Team

Chase Utley, second base (2009)

Players Choice Awards Player of the Year

Note: Awarded by fellow major-league players to one player in Major League Baseball (not one for each league), including all positions. The Players Choice Awards do not have a Pitcher of the Year award.
Ryan Howard (2006)

Baseball America Major League Player of the Year

Note: Awarded to one player in Major League Baseball (not one for each league), including all positions. Baseball America does not have a Pitcher of the Year award.
Roy Halladay (2010)

Best Major League Baseball Player ESPY Award

Note: Awarded to one player in Major League Baseball (not one for each league), including all positions. The ESPYs do not have a Pitcher of the Year award.
Roy Halladay (2011) – presented in June 2011, for his performance since June 2010

Sporting News Player of the Year Award

Note: Awarded to one player in Major League Baseball (not one for each league). Sporting News also has a Pitcher of the Year award in each league.
Robin Roberts (1952)
Ryan Howard (2006)

Baseball Digest Player of the Year

Note: Awarded to one position player in Major League Baseball (not one for each league) since 1994, when Baseball Digest started its Pitcher of the Year award.
Mike Schmidt (1981)
Jimmy Rollins (2007)

NLBM Oscar Charleston Legacy Award (NL MVP)

Ryan Howard (2006)
Jimmy Rollins (2007)

The Sporting News NL Most Valuable Player Award

Note: Discontinued in 1946
Chuck Klein (1931, 1932)

Baseball Digest Pitcher of the Year
 
Note: Awarded to one pitcher in Major League Baseball (not one in each league).
Roy Halladay (2010)

Players Choice Awards NL Outstanding Player

Ryan Howard (2006)

Players Choice Awards NL Outstanding Pitcher

Roy Halladay (2010)

Baseball Prospectus Internet Baseball Awards NL Cy Young

Roy Halladay (2010)

NLBM Wilbur "Bullet" Rogan Legacy Award (NL Pitcher of the Year)

Roy Halladay (2010)

Sporting News NL Pitcher of the Year Award

Jim Konstanty (1950)
Robin Roberts (1952, 1955)
Steve Carlton (1972, 1977, 1980, 1982)
John Denny (1983)
Roy Halladay (2010)

USA Today NL Cy Young
Roy Halladay (2010)

Sporting News NL Reliever of the Year Award

See footnote

TSN NL Fireman of the Year Award (1960–2000; for closers)
Al Holland (1983; co-winner)
Steve Bedrosian (1987)

SN NL Reliever of the Year Award (2001–present; for all relievers)
Brad Lidge (2008)

Players Choice Awards NL Outstanding Rookie

1997 – Scott Rolen
2009 – J. A. Happ

NLBM Larry Doby Legacy Award (NL Rookie of the Year)

Ryan Howard (2005)

Sporting News NL Rookie of the Year Award

Note: In 1961 and from 1963 through 2003, TSN split the rookie award into two separate categories: Rookie Pitcher of the Year and Rookie Player of the Year. Also, for the first three years (1946–1948) and in 1950, there was a single award, for all of MLB.

1946 – Del Ennis (in MLB)
1948 – Richie Ashburn (in MLB)
1957 – Jack Sanford
1964 – Dick Allen (Rookie Player of the Year)

1980 – Lonnie Smith (Rookie Player of the Year)
1984 – Juan Samuel (Rookie Player of the Year)
1997 – Scott Rolen (Rookie Player of the Year)
2009 – J. A. Happ (2009)

Baseball Prospectus Internet Baseball Awards NL Rookie of the Year

2005 – Ryan Howard

Baseball America All-Rookie Team

 2009 – J. A. Happ (P; one of five pitchers)
 2011 – Vance Worley (SP; one of five starting pitchers)

Topps All-Star Rookie teams

Note: Each year's team includes one left-handed pitcher, one right-handed pitcher, and three outfielders.

1959 – Joe Koppe (SS)
1960 – Jimmie Coker (C), Tony Curry (OF)
1963 – Ray Culp (RHP)
1964 – Richie Allen (3B)
1969 – Don Money (SS), Larry Hisle (OF)
1970 – Larry Bowa (SS)
1971 – Willie Montañez (OF)
1972 – Tom Hutton (1B)
1973 – Bob Boone (C)
1975 – Tom Underwood (LHP)
1980 – Lonnie Smith (OF)

1984 – Juan Samuel (2B)
1986 – Bruce Ruffin (LHP)
1997 – Scott Rolen (3B)
2000 – Pat Burrell (1B)
2001 – Jimmy Rollins (SS)
2007 – Carlos Ruiz (C)
2009 – J. A. Happ (LHP)
2016 – Tommy Joseph (1B)
2018 – Jorge Alfaro (C)
2020 – Alec Bohm (3B)

Babe Ruth Home Run Award

Note: Awarded to the leader(s) in Major League Baseball (not one for each league).
Jim Thome (2003; co-winner)
Ryan Howard (2006, 2008)

NLBM Josh Gibson Legacy Award (NL home-run leader)

Ryan Howard (2006, 2008)

NLBM James "Cool Papa" Bell Legacy Award (NL stolen-base leader)

Jimmy Rollins (2001; co-winner)

Fielding Bible Award

Second base
Chase Utley (2010)

Shortstop
Jimmy Rollins (2008)

Players Choice Awards NL Comeback Player

Darren Daulton (1997)
Mike Lieberthal (2002, tied with John Smoltz)

Sporting News NL Comeback Player of the Year Award

John Denny (1983)
Darren Daulton (1997)
Mike Lieberthal

Associated Press Comeback Player of the Year Award
Eddie Waitkus (1950)

Babe Ruth Award (postseason MVP)

Tug McGraw (1980)
Cole Hamels (2008)

MLB Insiders Club Magazine All-Postseason Team
2011 – Jimmy Rollins (SS), Roy Halladay (SP; one of three)

Sporting News Top 50 Players 
2009 – Chase Utley (#6), Ryan Howard (#11), Jimmy Rollins (#15), and Cole Hamels (#49)

Players Choice Awards Marvin Miller Man of the Year

Note: Awarded by fellow major-league players as the Man of the Year in Major League Baseball (not one for each league).
Jim Thome (2004)

Lou Gehrig Memorial Award

Robin Roberts (1962; while with the Baltimore Orioles)
Mike Schmidt (1983)
Curt Schilling (1995)
Jim Thome (2004)
Shane Victorino (2008)

Heart & Hustle Award

Note: Awarded by the Major League Baseball Players Alumni Association
Roy Halladay (2010)

Tony Conigliaro Award

Jim Eisenreich (1990)
Dickie Thon (1991)

Branch Rickey Award

Shane Victorino (2011)

Tip O'Neill Award

Note: For Canadian players only.
Dave Shipanoff (1985)

Sporting News Manager of the Year Award

Note: Established in 1936, this award was given annually to one manager in Major League Baseball. In 1986 it was expanded to honor one manager from each league.
See footnote
Danny Ozark (1976) (in both leagues)
Larry Bowa (2001) (in NL)

Associated Press Manager of the Year Award

Note: Discontinued in 2001. From 1959 to 1983, the award was given annually to one manager in each league. From 1984 to 2000, the award was given to one manager in all of Major League Baseball.
See footnote
Eddie Sawyer (1950) (in both leagues)
Gene Mauch (1962, 1964) (in NL)
Danny Ozark (1976) (in NL)
Jim Fregosi (1993) (in both leagues)

Baseball Prospectus Internet Baseball Awards NL Manager of the Year

See footnote
Larry Bowa (2001)

Chuck Tanner Major League Baseball Manager of the Year Award

See footnote
Charlie Manuel (2010)

Sporting News Executive of the Year Award

Bob Carpenter
Lee Thomas

Team award
 – National League pennant
 – National League pennant
1980 – Warren C. Giles Trophy (National League champion)
 – World Series Trophy
1981 (1980 Phillies) – John Wanamaker Athletic Award (Philadelphia Sports Congress)
1983 – Warren C. Giles Trophy (National League champion)
1993 – Warren C. Giles Trophy (National League champion)
1994 (1993 Phillies) – John Wanamaker Athletic Award (Philadelphia Sports Congress)
2007 – Philadelphia Sports Writers Association "Team of the Year"
2007 (induction of the 1980 Phillies) – Philadelphia Sports Hall of Fame
2008 – Warren C. Giles Trophy (National League champion)
 – Commissioner's Trophy (World Series)
2008 – Pride of Philadelphia Award (Philadelphia Sports Hall of Fame)
2008 – Philadelphia Sports Writers Association "Team of the Year"
2009 (2008 Phillies) – John Wanamaker Athletic Award (Philadelphia Sports Congress)
2009 – Warren C. Giles Trophy (National League champion)
 – Baseball America Organization of the Year
2009 – No. 33 on Sports Illustrated list of Top Franchises of the Decade (in MLB, NBA, NFL, NHL, college basketball, and college football)
2009 – Philadelphia Sports Writers Association "Team of the Year"
2011 – Philadelphia Sports Writers Association "Team of the Year"
 – Best Farm System MiLBY Award

Team records (single-game, single-season, career)

Other achievements

National Baseball Hall of Fame

Phillies all-time team (1969)
In conjunction with Major League Baseball's celebration in 1969 of the 100th anniversary of professional baseball, the Phillies conducted a fan vote to determine their all-time team. The players were honored on August 5, 1969, at Connie Mack Stadium before the Phillies' game against the San Francisco Giants. The players were as follows:

Andy Seminick, C
Eddie Waitkus, 1B
Cookie Rojas, 2B
Granny Hamner, SS
Willie Jones, 3B
Chuck Klein, RF
Del Ennis, OF
Richie Ashburn, CF
Robin Roberts, RHP
Chris Short, LHP

Roberts was also honored as the greatest Phillies player of all time.

Centennial Team (1983)
In 1983, rather than inducting a player into the Wall of Fame, the Phillies selected their Centennial Team, commemorating the best players of the first 100 years in franchise history. See Philadelphia Baseball Wall of Fame#Centennial Team.

Phillies All-Vet Team (2003)
As part of the Final Innings festivities at Veterans Stadium, the Phillies announced the result of an online fan vote to determine their "All-Vet" team (1971–2003). The players were honored on September 27, 2003, prior to the penultimate game at the stadium, which the Phillies went on to win against the Atlanta Braves 7–6. The players were as follows:

Darren Daulton, C
John Kruk, 1B
Juan Samuel, 2B
Larry Bowa, SS
Mike Schmidt, 3B
Bobby Abreu, RF
Greg Luzinski, LF
Garry Maddox, CF
Curt Schilling, RHP
Steve Carlton, LHP

Schilling was playing for the Arizona Diamondbacks and was unavailable for the ceremony. All the other honorees attended, including Tug McGraw, who was recovering from brain surgery.

Wall of Fame

Retired numbers

Dallas Green Award (scouting)

Bill Harper (2012)

Richie Ashburn Special Achievement Award
See footnote
Jerry Clothier (2011)

Ford C. Frick Award (broadcasters)

Note: Names with asterisks received the award based primarily on their work as Phillies broadcasters.
By Saam (1990)*
Herb Carneal (1996)
Harry Kalas (2002)*

BBWAA Career Excellence Award (baseball writers)

James Isaminger (Philadelphia Inquirer) (1974)
Allen Lewis (Philadelphia Inquirer) (1981)
Ray Kelly (Philadelphia Bulletin) (1988)
Bus Saidt (The Trentonian and Trenton Times) (1992)
Bill Conlin (Philadelphia Daily News) (2011)

Honor Rolls of Baseball (writers)

Frank Hough (Philadelphia Inquirer) (1946)

Philadelphia Chapter / BBWAA awards

Mike Schmidt Most Valuable Player Award
Steve Carlton Most Valuable Pitcher Award
Dallas Green Special Achievement Award
Tug McGraw Good Guy Award
Charlie Manuel Award for Service and Passion to Baseball

World Baseball Classic All-WBC Team 
 – Jimmy Rollins (shortstop)

All-American Amateur Baseball Association Hall of Fame

See: All-American Amateur Baseball Association Hall of Fame
Rubén Amaro, Jr. (2008)

Arizona Fall League Hall of Fame

Jimmy Rollins (2008)
Ryan Howard (2011)
Chase Utley (2015)

Hispanic Heritage Baseball Museum Hall of Fame

Cookie Rojas (2011)
Juan Samuel (2010)
Tony Taylor (2004)

Irish American Baseball Hall of Fame
Tug McGraw (2008)

Peter J. McGovern Little League Museum Hall of Excellence

Mike Schmidt (1991)

Associated Press Athlete of the Year

Jim Konstanty

Sporting News Pro Athlete of the Year

Roy Halladay (2010)

Hickok Belt
Note: The Hickok Belt trophy was awarded to the top professional athlete of the year in the U.S., from 1950 to 1976. It was re-established in 2012.
Steve Carlton (1972)

Sports Illustrated Top 10 GMs/Executives of the Decade (2009)

No. 7 – Pat Gillick, Seattle Mariners/Philadelphia Phillies (the list's only other MLB GMs were Boston's Theo Epstein, No. 3, and Oakland's Billy Beane, No. 10)

Delaware Sports Museum and Hall of Fame

1978 – Bob Carpenter
1979 – Chris Short

1980 – Huck Betts
1983 – Dallas Green

1987 – Ruly Carpenter
1992 – Harry "the Horse" Walter Anderson

Pennsylvania Sports Hall of Fame

1966 – Robin Roberts
1968 – Curt Simmons
1972 – Richie Ashburn

1975 – Del Ennis
1986 – Eddie Sawyer
1988 – Art Mahaffey

1996 – Dick Allen
2003 – Lee Elia
2005 – Greg Gross

Philadelphia Sports Writers Association (PSWA) awards

PSWA Pro Athlete of the Year
Jimmy Rollins (2007; award was then called "Outstanding Pro Athlete")
Brad Lidge (2008; award was then called "Outstanding Pro Athlete")
Roy Halladay (2010)

PSWA Executive of the Year
Rubén Amaro, Jr. (2009)

PSWA Living Legend Award
2007 – Harry Kalas
2012 – Larry Bowa

PSWA Humanitarian Award
Note: In 2012, this award was renamed the Ed Snider Lifetime Distinguished Humanitarian Award.
2009 – Dickie Noles
2010 – Shane Victorino
2015 – David Montgomery (chairman)

PSWA Good Guy Award

1978 – Tim McCarver
1980 – Tug McGraw
1983 – Al Holland
1984 – Greg Gross

1993 – Curt Schilling
1995 – Mickey Morandini
1996 – Ricky Bottalico
1997 – Rico Brogna

2000 – Doug Glanville
2004 – Jim Thome
2006 – Chris Coste
2011 – Hunter Pence

PSWA Lifetime Achievement Award
Larry Shenk (public-relations director) (2007)

PSWA Special Achievement Award
2011 – Charlie Manuel
2012 – Jimmy Rollins

John Wanamaker Athletic Award (Philadelphia Sports Congress)
Note: The award is presented during the summer, based on the awardee's performance during the preceding calendar year.
See footnotes

1964 – Gene Mauch
1973 – Steve Carlton
1977 – Mike Schmidt
1981 – 1980 Phillies

1983 – Steve Carlton
1994 – 1993 Phillies
1998 – Curt Schilling
2007 – Ryan Howard

2008 – Jimmy Rollins
2009 – 2008 Phillies
2011 – Roy Halladay

Pride of Philadelphia Award

Ryan Howard (2006)
Jimmy Rollins (2007)
Philadelphia Phillies (2008)
Carlos Ruiz (2010)

Daily News Sportsperson of the Year

Brad Lidge (2008)
Roy Halladay (2010, 2011)

Philadelphia Jewish Sports Hall of Fame
Rubén Amaro, Jr. (2009)

Philadelphia Sports Hall of Fame

2004 – Richie Ashburn, Steve Carlton, Harry Kalas ("Legacy of Excellence"; broadcaster), Robin Roberts, Mike Schmidt
2005 – Grover Cleveland Alexander
2006 – Del Ennis
2007 – 1980 Phillies, Chuck Klein
2008 – Ed Delahanty
2009 – Larry Bowa
2010 – Tug McGraw, Dick Allen
2011 – Curt Simmons
2012 – Johnny Callison
2013 – Greg Luzinski
2014 – Chief Bender, Curt Schilling
2015 – Sam Thompson, Garry Maddox
2016 – Chris Short, Charlie Manuel

Great Friend to Kids (GFTK) Award
Note: Awarded by Please Touch Museum (the Children's Museum of Philadelphia)
Phillie Phanatic (2009)

Minor-league system

See footnotes
For one-year status as the top organization in MiLB—based on the combined win–loss percentage of its domestic affiliates in MiLB—see footnote.

Team championships
Double-A: Reading Phillies (1968, 1973, 1995, 2001 (tied; series cancelled); Eastern League)
High-A: Clearwater Phillies (1993; Florida State League), Clearwater Threshers (2007; Florida State League)
Single-A: Rocky Mount Phillies (1975; Carolina League)
Low-A: Spartanburg Phillies (1988; South Atlantic League), Lakewood BlueClaws (2006, 2009, 2010; South Atlantic League)

MiLBY Awards

Top Offensive Player
Dylan Cozens (2016)

Joe Bauman Home Run Award

Ryan Howard (2004)
Darin Ruf (2012)
Dylan Cozens (2016)

Baseball America Minor League All-Star Team
First team
 2017 – Rhys Hoskins (1B), Lehigh Valley IronPigs (AAA)

Second team
 2017 – Scott Kingery (2B), Reading Fightin' Phils (AA)

Baseball America Minor League Manager of the Year

2011 – Ryne Sandberg, Lehigh Valley IronPigs

King of Baseball

"Note: This ceremonial title is awarded by Minor League Baseball to one person each year in recognition of longtime dedication and service to professional baseball.
Pat Gillick (2008)

Baseball America Triple-A Classification All-Star Team
2017 – Rhys Hoskins (1B) and Tom Eshelman (SP; 1 of 5), Lehigh Valley IronPigs

International League Most Valuable Player

2017 – Rhys Hoskins, Lehigh Valley IronPigs

International League Most Valuable Pitcher

2012 – Tyler Cloyd, Lehigh Valley IronPigs
2016 – Jake Thompson, Lehigh Valley IronPigs

International League Rookie of the Year

2017 – Rhys Hoskins, Lehigh Valley IronPigs

International League Postseason All-Star Team
Andy Tracy, Lehigh Valley IronPigs (2009)
Rhys Hoskins, Lehigh Valley IronPigs (2017; 1B)

Pacific Coast League Most Valuable Player

1967 – Rick Joseph, San Diego Padres (PCL)
1969 – Denny Doyle, Eugene Emeralds

Baseball America Double-A Classification All-Star Team
2017 – Scott Kingery (2B), Reading Fightin’ Phils

Eastern League Most Valuable Player

1970 – Greg Luzinski, Reading Phillies
1980 – Mark Davis, Reading Phillies
1983 – Jeff Stone, Reading Phillies
2001 – Marlon Byrd, Reading Phillies
2004 – Ryan Howard, Reading Phillies
2012 – Darin Ruf, Reading Phillies
2015 – Brock Stassi, Reading Fightin' Phils

Eastern League Pitcher of the Year

2002 – Ryan Madson, Reading Phillies

Eastern League Rookie of the Year

1999 – Pat Burrell, Reading Phillies
2001 – Marlon Byrd, Reading Phillies
2004 – Ryan Howard, Reading Phillies
2005 – Chris Roberson, Reading Phillies
2009 – Michael Taylor, Reading Phillies
2012 – Darin Ruf, Reading Phillies
2016 – Rhys Hoskins, Reading Fightin Phils

Eastern League Manager of the Year

Bob Wellman, Reading Phillies (1975)
Bill Dancy, Reading Phillies (1983, 1995)
Al LeBeouf, Reading Phillies (1997)
Gary Varsho, Reading Phillies (2000)
Dusty Wathan, Reading Fightin' Phils (2015)

Stenson Award (Arizona Fall League)

2008 – Jason Donald, Mesa Solar Sox

Baseball America Low Class A Classification All-Star Team
2017 – Darick Hall (1B) and Nick Fanti (SP; 1 of 5), Lakewood BlueClaws

Baseball America Rookie-Level Classification All-Star Team
2017 – Jhordan Mezquita (SP; 1 of 5), Gulf Coast League Phillies

Baseball America Dominican Summer League Classification All-Star Team
2017 – Leonel Aponte (SP; 1 of 5), DSL Phillies

Baseball America Short-Season Classification All-Star Team
2017 – Jhailyn Ortiz (OF; 1 of 3), Williamsport Crosscutters

Paul Owens Award (pitcher and position player)

For a description of the award and a list of awardees from 1986 to 2007, see footnote.
For a list of awardees from 1986 to 2011, see footnote.

1986 – Marvin Freeman (RHP)
1986 – Ron Jones (OF)
1987 – Todd Frohwirth (RHP)
1987 – Ricky Jordan (1B)
1988 – Andy Carter (LHP)
1988 – Jim Vatcher (OF)
1989 – Jason Grimsley (RHP)
1989 – Mickey Morandini (SS)
1990 – Andy Ashby (RHP)
1990 – Jeff Grotewold (C)
1991 – Toby Borland (RHP)
1991 – Kim Batiste (SS)
1992 – Paul Fletcher (RHP)
1992 – Mike Lieberthal (C)
1993 – Ricky Bottalico (RHP)
1993 – Phil Geisler (OF)
1994 – Ron Blazier (RHP)
1994 – Gene Schall (1B)
1995 – Rich Hunter (RHP)
1995 – David Doster (2B) and Wendell Magee (OF)
1996 – Matt Beech (LHP)
1996 – Scott Rolen (3B)
1997 – Ryan Brannan (RHP)
1997 – Jeff Key (OF) and Jimmy Rollins (SS)
1998 – Carlton Loewer (RHP)
1998 – Marlon Anderson (2B)
1999 – Adam Eaton (RHP)
1999 – Pat Burrell (1B)
2000 – Brandon Duckworth (RHP)
2000 – Marlon Byrd (OF)
2001 – Brandon Duckworth (RHP)
2001 – Marlon Byrd (OF)
2002 – Ryan Madson (RHP)
2002 – Chase Utley (3B)
2003 – Cole Hamels (LHP)
2003 – Ryan Howard (1B)
2004 – Scott Mitchinson (RHP)
2004 – Ryan Howard (1B)
2005 – Robinson Tejeda (RHP)
2005 – Chris Roberson (OF)
2006 – Carlos Carrasco (RHP)
2006 – Michael Bourn (OF)
2007 – Mike Zagurski (LHP)
2007 – Quintin Berry (OF)
2008 – J. A. Happ (LHP)
2008 – Lou Marson (C)
 – Kyle Drabek (RHP)
2009 – Michael Taylor (OF)
2010 – Scott Mathieson (RHP)
2010 – Domonic Brown (OF)
2011 – Trevor May (RHP)
2011 – Freddy Galvis (SS)
2012 – Tyler Cloyd (RHP)
2012 – Darin Ruf (OF)
2013 – Severino Gonzalez (RHP)
2013 – Maikel Franco (3B)
2014 – Luis García (RHP)
2014 – J. P. Crawford (SS)
2015 – Ricardo Pinto (RHP)
2015 – Andrew Knapp (C)
2016 – Ben Lively (RHP)
2016 – Dylan Cozens (OF) and Rhys Hoskins (1B)
2017 – Tom Eshelman (RHP)
2017 – Scott Kingery (2B)
2018 - David Parkinson (LHP)
2018- Austin Listi (1B) 
2019 – Ethan Lindow (RHP)
2019 – Alec Bohm (3B)
2021 - Jean Cabrera (RHP)
2021 - Bryson Stott (SS)

See also
Baseball awards
List of Major League Baseball awards

Footnotes

Further reading

Bruce Brown and T. Scott Brandon (May 19, 2008), The All–Phillies/A's Team (8 players and 9 pitchers, among the 44 players who played for both the Philadelphia A's and Phillies). Blog: The Phillies Zone. Philly.com. Retrieved 2010-09-26.

External links
 Awards. Philadelphia Phillies official website
 All-time Leaders. Philadelphia Phillies official website
 Single-Game Records. Philadelphia Phillies official website

Award
Major League Baseball team trophies and awards
Award